Year of the Dragon or The Year of the Dragon may refer to:

Astrology
 Dragon (zodiac), Chinese Year of the Dragon zodiac sign

Art, entertainment, and media

Films
 Year of the Dragon (film), 1985 film directed by Michael Cimino, starring Mickey Rourke

Games
 Spyro: Year of the Dragon, a PlayStation video game released in 2000

Literature
 Year of the Dragon (1981), novel written by Robert Daley
 The Year of the Dragon (play), a play by Frank Chin, later adapted into a film starring George Takei

Music
In the Year of the Dragon, 1989 album by Geri Allen, Charlie Haden & Paul Motian
 Year of the Dragon (Busta Rhymes album)
 Year of the Dragon (EP) by Machine Head
 Year of the Dragon (Modern Talking album), 2000
 The Year of the Dragon (music), a three-movement work composed by Philip Sparke
 Year of the Dragon Tour Diary: Japan, EP from Machine Head